Jordi Bitter (born 19 January 1994) is a Dutch footballer who plays as a forward for SV Spakenburg in the Dutch Tweede Divisie.

Career

Early career

Bitter began his football career at the age of six with local amateur side RKSV DCG in his hometown Amsterdam. He then transferred to local SV DTS from where he joined the youth ranks of AZ in nearby Alkmaar and subsequently moved to HFC Haarlem after which he joined the youth ranks of the Dutch giants AFC Ajax, following the dissolution of the team from Haarlem in 2010.

AFC Ajax
Signing his first professional contract with AFC Ajax on 9 June 2011, a three-year deal binding him to the club until the summer 2014. Initially returning to the youth ranks, he was announced as a member of the Jong Ajax squad ahead of the 2013–14 season, having previously participated in preseason training with the first team, playing for the reserves team of Ajax who made their Eerste Divisie debut that season. On 28 October 2013 Bitter made his professional debut for Jong Ajax having recently recovered from a shoulder injury, he was substituted on in the 72'-minute of the match for Tobias Sana, in the 4–0 away loss against FC Dordrecht.

Almere City FC
On 20 May 2014 it was announced that Bitter would transfer to nearby partner club of Ajax; Almere City FC as a free transfer, where former Ajax youth coach Fred Grim was active.

International career
Bitter made his debut for the Netherlands under-17 squad in a friendly match against Greece U-17 on 8 February 2011, which ended in a 0–1 win for the Dutch. Following another friendly match for the Netherlands U-17, a 2–0 win over Belgium U-17 on 2 March 2011, Bitter was then called up for three qualification matches, ahead of the 2011 UEFA European Under-17 Football Championship in Serbia. Not making any appearances in the final tournament, which the Dutch won, securing their first European Under-17 Championship title. The three qualification matches in which Bitter did appear in were against Austria U-17, Croatia U-17 and Portugal U-17, which ended in 2 wins and a draw for the Netherlands. He did however play again in the 2011 FIFA U-17 World Cup for the Netherlands U-17, appearing in the fixtures against North Korea U-17 and Mexico U-17 in Mexico, which ended in a draw and a loss for the Dutch as they exited the tournament after the group stage.

Career statistics

Club performance

1 Includes UEFA Champions League and UEFA Europa League matches.

2 Includes Johan Cruijff Shield and Play-off matches.

References

External links
Netherlands U17 stats at OnsOranje

1994 births
Living people
Dutch footballers
Association football forwards
Footballers from Amsterdam
Eerste Divisie players
Tweede Divisie players
Jong Ajax players
Almere City FC players
SV Spakenburg players
Netherlands youth international footballers
Netherlands under-21 international footballers